Grevillea ripicola, commonly known as Collie grevillea, is a species of flowering plant in the family Proteaceae and is endemic to the South West region of Western Australia. It is a dense, spreading shrub with pinnatipartite leaves with rigid, sharply-pointed lobes, and clusters of yellowish-orange flowers, usually with a red style.

Description

Taxonomy  
Grevillea ripicola was first formally described in 1974 Alex George in the journal Nuytsia based on plant material he collected at Collie in 1965. The specific epithet (ripicola) means "growing on river banks".

Distribution and habitat
Collie grevillea grows near creeks in Jarrah forest, mainly between Collie, Donnybrook and Bridgetown in the Jarrah Forest bioregion of south-western Western Australia.

Conservation status 
Grevillea ripicola is classified as "Priority Four" by the Government of Western Australia Department of Biodiversity, Conservation and Attractions, meaning that it is rare or near threatened.

Use in horticulture
This grevillea is well adapted to cultivation and is frost hardy and fast-growing. Its dense foliage provides habitat for small birds. It is adaptable to most soils and conditions and has been grown on the east coast, south from Sydney.

References

ripicola
Eudicots of Western Australia
Proteales of Australia
Plants described in 1974
Taxa named by Alex George